Rupertia hallii is a species of flowering plant in the legume family known by the common name Hall's California tea, or Hall's rupertia. It is endemic to California, where it is known only from a small section of the northern Sierra Nevada foothills on the border between Butte and Tehama Counties. It is a perennial herb approaching a meter in height with slender, leafy branches. The leaves are each made up of three lance-shaped or oval, pointed leaflets measuring up to 9 centimeters long. The inflorescence is a clustered raceme of several whitish or yellowish pealike flowers. Each flower has a tubular calyx of sepals and a corolla spreading to about a centimeter in width. The fruit is a hairy, gland-speckled legume around a centimeter long.

References

External links
Jepson Manual Treatment
USDA Plants Profile
Photo gallery

Psoraleeae
Endemic flora of California
Flora of the Sierra Nevada (United States)
Taxa named by James Walter Grimes